Vengerov is a Russian and Ukrainian surname derived from the word vengr (венгр), which means "Hungarian". It was given to the people who arrived from Hungary and their descendants, not necessarily of Hungarian origin. Alternative spellings include Vengerova, Vengerof, Vengerovsky, and Wengeroff. The name may refer to:

Gennadi Vengerov (1959–2015), Russian actor
Isabelle Vengerova (1877–1956), American musician
Maxim Vengerov (born 1974), Russian-born Israeli violinist, violist, and conductor
Pauline Wengeroff (1833–1916), Russian-Jewish German-language writer
Semyon Vengerov (1855–1920), Russian literary historian
Vladimir Vengerov (1920–1997), Russian film director
Yury Vengerovsky (1941–2004), Ukrainian volleyball player

References 

Slavic-language surnames
Russian-language surnames
Ukrainian-language surnames
Jewish surnames